Gillis Ferdinand Ahlberg (8 November 1892 – 6 November 1930) was a Swedish rowing coxswain who competed in the 1912 Summer Olympics.

He coxed the Swedish boat Göteborgs which was eliminated in the first round of the men's eights tournament.

References

1892 births
1930 deaths
Swedish male rowers
Coxswains (rowing)
Olympic rowers of Sweden
Rowers at the 1912 Summer Olympics